Canal Lands were tracts of land donated by the federal government to several Great Lakes states in the 19th century to encourage internal improvements and aid in funding the construction of Canals.  These states sold the land tracts to private parties to raise funds for canal construction.

Checkerboarding was used as a compromise method between opponents and proponents of such federal subsidies, and this subsidy system continued with land grants to railroads between 1851 and 1870.

Previous grants

The federal government initiated donations to the states for internal improvements with the Ohio Enabling act in 1802.  This act set aside 5 percent of the proceeds of sale of federal land within the state to fund roads connecting the state to the east coast, and for roads within the state.  This act was later amended to award two percent to build roads connecting Ohio to the East, and three percent for roads within the state.  This established a precedent extended to other states, which received two, three or five percent of sale proceeds.

Canal era

The era of canal building in the west began after the success of the Erie Canal in New York.  States wanted to build canals to connect the Great Lakes with the Mississippi River basin.  The first federal action to support such canals was for Indiana, to allow a canal between the Wabash River and Lake Erie, in 1824.  This act was not utilized.  The act of March 2, 1827 granted land equal to two and one half sections on each side of the canal to Indiana, that they could resell to support canal construction, with deadlines for completion of the canal, and free passage on the canal for the federal government.  Part of this canal passed through Ohio, so the act of June 30, 1834 corrected the unpleasantness on Indiana being granted land in Ohio, and instead granted the land to Ohio.  Grants of two and one half sections either side of canals were extended to other states for their projects, as in the table, along with some grants not based on that calculation.

Ohio Canal Lands

Ohio had constructed a canal to connect the Ohio River to Dayton.  The act of 1828 was to support extension to the Maumee River in the north, where it would connect to the Wabash and Erie Canal and Lake Erie.  The  grant was applied to construction of the Ohio and Erie Canal in the eastern half of the state. Ohio earned $2,257,487 from sale of their lands located in the northwest of the state.

Other grants for improvements

The United States granted more than one million acres (4,000 km²) for military wagon roads in the nineteenth century. Large amounts of land were donated to build railroads.

Notes

References

External links
Ohio History Central- Canals
Ohio History Central- Canal Lands

History of the Midwestern United States
United States federal public land legislation